The  was a Japanese limited express electric multiple unit (EMU) train type introduced in 1972 by Japanese National Railways (JNR). Following the privatization of JNR, the 183 series was operated by East Japan Railway Company (JR East) and West Japan Railway Company (JR-West). In terms of design, it is closely based on the late-model AC/DC 485 series, with minor cosmetic differences and DC-only drive. The last 189 series sets were withdrawn on 29 March 2019.

The trains were built by Hitachi, Kawasaki Heavy Industries, Kinki Sharyo, Nippon Sharyo, and Tokyu Car Corporation.

Former operations

JR East

 Azusa (seasonal only)
 Kaiji (seasonal only)
 Wing
 Moonlight Shinshū
 Moonlight Nagara
 Sazanami
 Wakashio
 Shiosai
 Ayame
 Suigo
 Toki
 Amagi
 Odoriko
 Asama
 Myōkō
 Ohayō Liner
 Chūō Liner (until March 2008)
 Ōme Liner (until June 2002)

JR-West

The 183 series trains operated by JR-West were actually DC-only conversions of 485 series trainsets. They were used on limited-express services from Kyoto and Shin-Osaka to the northern coast of Kyoto and Hyogo prefectures, as part of the "Kitakinki Big X Network". These trainsets were gradually phased out from spring 2011 in favor of the new 287 series, and completely removed from regular scheduled services by the start of the revised timetable on 16 March 2013.
 Kitakinki (until March 2011)
 Kounotori (until 15 March 2013)
 Kinosaki (until March 2013)
 Tamba (until March 2011)
 Hashidate (until March 2013)
 Maizuru (until March 2011)
 Monju (until March 2011)

References

 
 

Train-related introductions in 1972
Electric multiple units of Japan
1500 V DC multiple units of Japan
Kawasaki multiple units
Nippon Sharyo multiple units
Kinki Sharyo multiple units
Tokyu Car multiple units